Juan Pablo Molyneux is a Chilean-born American interior designer. Based on the Upper East Side New York and Le Marais Paris-France, he has designed the interiors of private residences, and public buildings, and private member's clubs in the Americas, Europe and the Middle East. Molyneux is known for his classic & traditional style.

Early life
Juan Pablo Molyneux was born in Chile. He grew up in Santiago, and vacationed in Europe. His father was a banker and a sports car collector. He grew up speaking Spanish, French and English, and playing rugby.

He graduated from the Catholic University of Chile, where he studied architecture. He later attended the Ecole des Beaux Arts and the Ecole du Louvre in Paris.

Career

Molyneux started his career in Santiago, and later moved to Buenos Aires, Argentina. Later, he moved to New York City. Today, he lives and works permently in Paris-France.

Molyneux has designed private residences in South America, North America, Europe, and the Middle East. In 2004, he designed the interior of the Cercle de l'Union interalliée, a private members' club in Paris. He designed the interior of the Pavilion of Treaties in Saint Petersburg, Russia.  Providing a grand yet intimate setting for diplomatic negotiations, Molyneux designed the rooms for the Russian Federation in the Palais des Nations, the United Nations headquarters in Geneva, giving the two salons both presence and a sense of history. In Doha, he designed a 40,000-square-foot palace for Sheikh Mohamed Bin Suhaim Al-Thani of the House of Thani, the ruling family of Qatar.

Molyneux serves on the Boards of Trustees of the American Friends of Versailles, the World Monuments Fund, and the French Heritage Society. He was honored by the French Heritage Society at their gala dinner dance in November, 2015.

2 books have been published about his work:

" Molyneux", Rizzoli 1997.

" Molyneux at home ", Assouline 2016.

French Minister of Culture & Communication, Jean Donnedieu de Vabres, made him a Knight in the Order of Arts and Letters, in 2004.

Personal life
Molyneux is a naturalized American citizen. He is married to Pilar Valdivieso, whom he met when they were both teenagers. After they moved to France, they reside in a hôtel particulier in Le Marais Paris. They also own the historic Château de Pouy-sur-Vannes in Champagne region, 150 kilometers South of Paris.  Several rescue dogs adopted from the French ASPCA reside at the château, and they are seen lounging on the sofas in the salon in a video produced for the FHS Gala in 2015.   He drives a Rolls-Royce.  An avid tennis player, Juan Pablo Molyneux has both grass and clay courts at the château, so that he can play year-round.

References

External links
 Official website

Living people
People from Santiago
Pontifical Catholic University of Chile alumni
Chilean emigrants to the United States
People from the Upper East Side
People from Aube
Chilean interior designers
Year of birth missing (living people)